An election to Dublin City Council took place on 24 May 2019 as part of the Irish local elections. 63 councillors were elected from 11 local electoral areas (LEAs) on the system of proportional representation by means of the single transferable vote (PR-STV) for a five-year term of office.

In 2014, there were nine LEAs each electing between six and nine councillors. Following the recommendations of the Local Area Boundary Committee Report in June 2018, there are now eleven LEAs each electing between five and seven councillors.

Sinn Féin had a bad election, losing eight seats to return with eight councillors, going from being the largest party to the fourth largest. Fianna Fáil won eleven seats an increase of two, to become the largest party on the council for the first time since 1999. The Green Party became the second largest party on the council for the first time going from three to ten councillors, making the largest gains of any party and winning a seat in every LEA they contested here. Labour returned with eight councillors the same as they did five years previous.

Results by party

Outgoing Councillor Ellis Ryan was elected in 2014 in the North Inner City as an Independent but subsequently joined the Workers' Party.

Outgoing Councillor Pat Dunne was elected in 2014 in Crumlin-Kimmage as a United Left candidate but was elected as an Independents 4 Change candidate in this election.

Outgoing Councillor John Lyons was a candidate for Independent Left which is an unregistered political party so appeared on the ballot paper as a non party independent.

Results by local electoral area

Artane–Whitehall

 

Outgoing Councillor John Lyons was a candidate for Independent Left which is an unregistered political party so appeared on the ballot paper as a non-party independent.

Ballyfermot–Drimnagh

Ballymun–Finglas

Cabra–Glasnevin

Clontarf

Donaghmede

Niamh McDonald was a candidate for Independent Left which is an unregistered political party so appeared on the ballot paper as a non-party independent.

Kimmage–Rathmines

North Inner City

Pembroke

South East Inner City

South West Inner City

Results by gender

Changes since 2019 local election

Co-options

Changes in affiliation

Footnotes

Sources

References

Dublin City Council election
2019
City Council election, 2019
Dublin City Council election